Dunn School is a private, independent, boarding and day school for grades 6-12 located on 55 acres in Los Olivos, California, United States, which is located in the Santa Ynez Valley, 35 miles from Santa Barbara. It was founded in 1957, by Tony Dunn under the name "The Valley School."

The school comprises a middle school, which serves 75 day students in grades 6–8, and an upper school (grades 9–12). Approximately 60% of the 175 upper school students board in on-campus dormitories. Total school enrollment is 250 students.

Dunn's motto is the Latin phrase “Ne Tentes Aut Perfice,” which translates to “All or Nothing.”

History
Upon hiring headmaster Tony Dunn in June 1957, The Valley School was incorporated and opened in September that year with an enrollment of 49 children, including 15 girls and boys in nursery-kindergarten, 14 boarding boys in grades 7-10 and 20 coed day students in grades 1–8. The 6-acre site in Los Olivos was previously home to the Valley Farm School, which was founded in 1949 by Mr. and Mrs. Percy Hodges. In 1959, Valley School co-founder and parent Craig Hamilton wrote a proposal to name the school after Dunn, which was adopted prior to the 1960–61 school year. By 1964, Dunn School had evolved to become all-male and serve grades 9–12. In 1970, girls were accepted as day students, and the school had its first two female graduates since 1962. The campus has been coeducational ever since.

Accreditation & Associations
Dunn School is a member of the National Association of Independent Schools (NAIS) and The Association of Boarding Schools (TABS). It is accredited by the Western Association of Schools and Colleges (WASC) and the California Association of Independent Schools (CAIS). Dunn is also partnered with the California Teacher Development Collaborative (CATDC) for professional development.

Whole Student Education
Dunn School practices whole student education, sometimes referred to as holistic education, a movement that seeks to engage all aspects of the learner, including mind, body and spirit. Dunn teaches to its five core values: emotional wellness, physical readiness, intellectual growth, social responsibility and moral courage.

In 2021, Dunn Head of School Kalyan Balaven launched The Whole Student podcast, where guests recall whole student experiences of their own. The debut episode featured then-Santa Barbara mayoral candidate James Joyce III. Later episodes included author and former journalist Irshad Manji, Instagram VP of Engineering Maria Zhang, and physicist Tané Remington.

Campus
The Dunn School campus sits along California State Route 154, which connects points of U.S. Route 101 by passing through the Los Padres National Forest. 
On-campus buildings include the Sinclaire Art Center, which features a painting studio, ceramic studio, and multimedia classroom for digital photography and film-making students. The athletic facilities include six tennis courts, four athletic fields, a pool, gymnasium, volleyball courts (indoor and outdoor), basketball courts (indoor and outdoor), running track, and rock climbing wall.

There are four student dormitories on campus: Senior Dorm, which was refurbished in 2002–03; Knoles Dorm, named for longtime faculty members Rose and Peter Knoles; Boone Dorm, named after alumnus and trustee Mike Boone; and the largest and lone girls residence Loy Dorm, named after former Head of School Steven Loy.

Additionally, there are 25 on-campus faculty residences, 40 classrooms, a science center with labs, Learning Strategies Center, performing arts theater, health center, and dining hall.

The Cindy Bronfman Leadership Center (CBLC), named for a former trustee and parent, opened in 2020. The CBLC is the hub of the leadership program and includes an innovation lab, a student-run café, a college counseling center and space for student study, reflection and collaboration. As announced in 2022, the CBLC will also be home to the Bob Jurgensen Entrepreneurship Major.

Dunn Middle School
Established in 1978, Dunn Middle School shares the same campus as the upper school but operates under its own motto, “Carpe Diem.” The middle school participates in outdoor education trips throughout the year, starting with a traditional all-school camping trip in Big Sur the 2nd day of school. The ‘Piece of Cake’ annual bike ride requires students to complete a 40+ mile round-trip ride to Los Alamos.

Arts
The Sinclaire Art Center features a drawing/painting studio, ceramic studio, and a multimedia classroom for digital photography and filmmaking.

Music classes take place in the historic schoolhouse at the center of campus, which is equipped with practice rooms, pianos, guitars, drums and many other instruments, as well as a digital recording facility. Music classes include vocal ensemble, instrumental ensemble, guitar/piano classes, music fundamentals, and jazz ensembles.

The school puts on two drama performances and one musical throughout the academic year. These performances and the rehearsals leading up to it take place in Nancy Luton Jackson Barn, which is named for a former Trustee.

Learning Strategies
Established in 1973, Dunn's Learning Strategies program provides individualized support for students with cognitive differences. The program offers two levels of support in the learning center: one-to-one learning strategies and executive group.

In the One to One Program, students are paired with a learning strategies specialist and will meet with him/her individually four times per week. In the Executive Group Program, students meet with their Learning Strategies specialist in a small group setting.

Inclusion
In 2021, Dunn Head of School Kalyan Balaven founded the Inclusion Lab of Santa Barbara County, a joint collaboration between public and independent schools in Santa Barbara County with the expressed purpose of progressing inclusion efforts across the board.

The Lab establishes professional development opportunities for educators within the County borders and beyond. Its first development opportunity was a workshop with author Irshad Manji in Jan. 2022 entitled Inclusion Through Moral Courage.

Academic
Classes average 11 students, and are taught seminar-style by teachers. Students enroll in a minimum of five academic classes each semester.

Athletics
Dunn School is a member of the Tri-County Athletic Association, a high school athletic conference that competes within the CIF Southern Section. The Dunn athletic teams are nicknamed the Earwigs. Adopted in the 1970s, the nickname's origin is attributed to an urban legend describing a rush of earwigs exiting a building on campus in its earliest days. In 2018, a trio of baseball players signed letters of intent to join NCAA Division I programs. Brandon Lawrence, shortstop and pitcher, signed with Michigan Wolverines baseball; Ethan Cloyd, catcher and pitcher, signed with California Golden Bears baseball; and John San Jule, center fielder, signed with Columbia Lions baseball.

Boys Soccer
The Dunn boys soccer team has produced both collegiate and professional players as well as multiple CIF-Southern Section divisional championships. In 2014, Fifi Baiden, a 2010 Dunn graduate, was selected in the third round of the Major League Soccer draft by the Columbus Crew after starring for UC Santa Barbara Gauchos men's soccer. Baiden was followed by Abu Danladi, drafted No. 1 overall by the expansion Minnesota United FC in the 2017 MLS SuperDraft after starring for UCLA Bruins men's soccer. While at Dunn, Danladi was named the National Gatorade Player of the Year, the highest honor available to a high school soccer player in the country. He scored 25 goals and had 15 assists during his senior season at Dunn in 2013–2014. In 2017, Dunn's Rodney Michael was named Gatorade California Boys Soccer Player of the Year and concluded his prep soccer career with 74 goals and 43 assists. Michael scored game-winning goals for Dunn in CIF-Southern Section divisional championship games in 2015 and 2017. The Earwigs also won a divisional title in 2020, going 20–0. Two players from the 2020 team also joined NCAA Division I programs: Brima Kamara (CSU Bakersfield) and Rene Pacheco (UC Santa Barbara).

Varsity Sports
Fall 
Cross Country (boys and girls)
Tennis (girls)
Volleyball (girls)
Fall Baseball (boys)
Ultimate Frisbee (coed)

Winter
Soccer (boys and girls)
Basketball (boys and girls)

Spring
Track & Field(boys and girls)
Baseball (boys)
Tennis (boys)
Volleyball (boys)

Notable alumni
Walter A. Haas Jr.
Abu Danladi
Ru Kuwahata
Kyle Wolf
Eric Martin Yellin
Justin Ching
King Gyan
Fifi Baiden
Fidencio Flores
Yoky Matsuoka
Michael K Boone
Bill Allen
Andrew Getty
Rodney Michael
David G. Armstrong
Nyuol Lueth Tong 
Bill Olds
Heather Callow
Michael Tetteh
Laurence Kaplan

Notable faculty
Bob Jurgensen
Ralph Lowe
Jim Griffith
Jessie Barrie

Dunn Heads of School

References

External links
 Official Dunn School website
 The Association of Boarding Schools profile

Boarding schools in California
High schools in Santa Barbara County, California
Private high schools in California
Santa Ynez Valley
Educational institutions established in 1957
1957 establishments in California